In abstract algebra, a representation of an associative algebra is a module for that algebra. Here an associative algebra is a (not necessarily unital) ring. If the algebra is not unital, it may be made so in a standard way (see the adjoint functors page); there is no essential difference between modules for the resulting unital ring, in which the identity acts by the identity mapping, and representations of the algebra.

Examples

Linear complex structure 

Then a representation of C is a real vector space V, together with an action of C on V (a map ).

Polynomial algebras 
Another important basic class of examples are representations of polynomial algebras, the free commutative algebras – these form a central object of study in commutative algebra and its geometric counterpart, algebraic geometry. A representation of a polynomial algebra in  variables over the field K is concretely a K-vector space with  commuting operators, and is often denoted  meaning the representation of the abstract algebra  where 

A basic result about such representations is that, over an algebraically closed field, the representing matrices are simultaneously triangularisable.

Specifically, applying the structure theorem for finitely generated modules over a principal ideal domain to this algebra yields as corollaries the various canonical forms of matrices, such as Jordan canonical form.

In some approaches to noncommutative geometry, the free noncommutative algebra (polynomials in non-commuting variables) plays a similar role, but the analysis is much more difficult.

Weights

Eigenvalues and eigenvectors can be generalized to algebra representations.

The generalization of an eigenvalue of an algebra representation is, rather than a single scalar, a one-dimensional representation  (i.e., an algebra homomorphism from the algebra to its underlying ring: a linear functional that is also multiplicative). This is known as a weight, and the analog of an eigenvector and eigenspace are called weight vector and weight space.

The case of the eigenvalue of a single operator corresponds to the algebra  and a map of algebras  is determined by which scalar it maps the generator T to. A weight vector for an algebra representation is a vector such that any element of the algebra maps this vector to a multiple of itself – a one-dimensional submodule (subrepresentation). As the pairing  is bilinear, "which multiple" is an A-linear functional of A (an algebra map A → R), namely the weight. In symbols, a weight vector is a vector  such that  for all elements  for some linear functional  – note that on the left, multiplication is the algebra action, while on the right, multiplication is scalar multiplication.

Thus of central interest are the free commutative algebras, namely the polynomial algebras. In this particularly simple and important case of the polynomial algebra  in a set of commuting matrices, a weight vector of this algebra is a simultaneous eigenvector of the matrices, while a weight of this algebra is simply a -tuple of scalars  corresponding to the eigenvalue of each matrix, and hence geometrically to a point in -space. These weights – in particularly their geometry – are of central importance in understanding the representation theory of Lie algebras, specifically the finite-dimensional representations of semisimple Lie algebras.

As an application of this geometry, given an algebra that is a quotient of a polynomial algebra on  generators, it corresponds geometrically to an algebraic variety in -dimensional space, and the weight must fall on the variety – i.e., it satisfies the defining equations for the variety. This generalizes the fact that eigenvalues satisfy the characteristic polynomial of a matrix in one variable.

See also
Representation theory
Intertwiner
Representation theory of Hopf algebras
Lie algebra representation
Schur’s lemma
Jacobson density theorem
Double commutant theorem

Notes

References

 Richard S. Pierce. Associative algebras. Graduate texts in mathematics, Vol. 88, Springer-Verlag, 1982, 

Algebras
Module theory
Representation theory